Melkite Greek Catholic Patriarchal Exarchate of Istanbul is an immediate Patriarchal Exarchate of the Melkite Greek Catholic Church in Istanbul. It reports directly to the Melkite Patriarch of Antioch.

History
Since 1946, Melkite Parish in Istanbul (Constantinople) was administrated by priest Maximos Mardelli (born 1913 – died 2000) who was appointed Patriarchal Vicar (exarch) in Istanbul, as representative of Melkite Patriarch Maximos IV Sayegh of Antioch. Exarch Maximos was elevated to the honour of Archimandrite in 1953 for his successful church administration. During Anti-Greek riots in 1955 (Istanbul pogrom), the Melkite Church building in Istanbul was destroyed. Because Archimandrite Maximos was not a Turkish citizen, he had to leave Istanbul and went to the United States.

References

External links
 Melkite Greek Catholic Church in Turkey 
 Melkite Greek Catholic Church: Patriarchal Exarchate of Istanbul

Istanbul
Eastern Catholic dioceses in Turkey
Eastern Catholicism in Turkey
Catholic Church in Turkey
Christianity in Istanbul
Organizations based in Istanbul